Margaret ("Petch") Sayers Peden (May 10, 1927 – July 5, 2020) was an American translator and professor emerita of Spanish at the University of Missouri. Prior to her death in 2020, Peden lived and worked in Columbia, Missouri.

Early life and education
Peden was born at West Plains, Missouri, daughter of horseman Harvey Monroe Sayers and Eleanor Green (née James), and grew up in many towns across Missouri. She was educated at William Woods University at Fulton, Missouri for two years, then studied at the University of Missouri, where she took bachelors, masters, and PhD degrees.

Career
After finishing her studies at the University of Missouri, Peden joined the Romance Languages Department, where she taught until her retirement.

Peden's work covers nearly every genre — poetry, novel, theater and belles lettres — from the 16th century to today. Peden received her bachelor's (1948), master's (1963) and doctorate (1966) from the University of Missouri. She started translating while working toward her doctorate in 1964. Peden was writing on Mexican playwright Emilio Carballido and came across a small novel Carballido had written. Peden shared the book with her former late husband, William Peden, who said, "You know I don't read Spanish. Why don't you translate it for me?" So she did.

Carballido's The Norther (El Norte) became her first published translation in 1970. She continued translating and teaching at the University of Missouri until she retired from teaching in 1989. She still translated works until her death.

In 2010, Peden's translation of Fernando de Rojas' La Celestina won the 2010 Lewis Galantiere Translation Prize, which the American Translators Association awards every other year to a book-length literary translation.

In 2012, she received the Ralph Manheim Medal for Translation from the PEN American Center. Named in honor of U.S. translator Ralph Manheim, this literary award is given every three years to a translator whose career has demonstrated a commitment to excellence through the body of her work. The medal is awarded in recognition of a lifetime achievement in the field of literary translation.

Throughout Peden's career, she translated more than 60 books from Spanish to English and is considered one of the leading translators of her time.

Personal life
She married first, in 1949, Robert Jackson Norwine (1924-2018), a real estate broker and dean of students at the New College of Florida from 1965 to 1967, with whom she had a son, Kyle, and daughter, Kerry. They were divorced in 1961. She married secondly William Harwood Peden (1913-1999), professor of English at the University of Missouri, writer, founder of the University of Missouri Press, and a key player in the creation of The Missouri Review; together they raised Peden's two daughters and her son and daughter by Robert Norwine. William Peden died in 1999. In 2002, Peden married Robert Harper, who survived her.

Selected translations
 Carlos Fuentes
 Terra Nostra 1976
 The Hydra Head, 1978
 Burnt Water, 1980
 Distant Relations, 1982
 The Old Gringo, 1985
 Inez, 2002
 Sor Juana Inés de la Cruz
 Woman of Genius, the Intellectual Biography of Sor Juana Inés de la Cruz, 1982
 Sor Juana Inés de la Cruz: Poems, 1985
 Poems, Protest, and a Dream, 1996
 Isabel Allende
 Of Love and Shadows, 1987
 The Stories of Eva Luna, 1991
 Paula, 1995
 Aphrodite: A Memoir of the Senses, 1998
 Daughter of Fortune, 1999
 Portrait in Sepia, 2001
 City of the Beasts, 2002
 My Invented Country, 2003
 Zorro, 2005
 Inés of My Soul, 2007
Island Beneath the Sea, 2010
 Octavio Paz
 Sor Juana Inés de la Cruz or The Traps of Faith, 1988
 Pablo Neruda
 Passions and Impressions, 1983
 Elemental Odes, 1990
 Juan Rulfo
 Pedro Páramo, 1994
 Arturo Pérez-Reverte
 The Nautical Chart, 2001
 Captain Alatriste, 2005
 Painter of Battles 2008
 Claribel Alegría
 Casting Off, 2003
 Antonio Muñoz Molina 
 Sepharad, 2003
 Alfredo Castañeda
 My Book of Hours, 2006
 Cesar Vallejo
 Spain, Take This Chalice From Me, 2008
 Fernando de Rojas
 La Celestina, 2009

Awards and honors
 2012 PEN/Ralph Manheim Medal for Translation
 2011 Gala at the meeting of the American Literary Translators Association 
 2010 Lewis Galantiere Translation Prize
 2004 PEN Translation Prize
 1988 Homenaje offered by Feria Internacional del Libro, American Literary Translators Association and La Universidad de Guadalajara, Mexico
 1992 Gregory Kolovakos Award from PEN
 1985 The University of Missouri Presidential Award for Research
 1983 Resident Scholar, Rockefeller Study and Conference Center, Bellagio, Italy
 1979-86 Catherine Paine Middlebush Chair of Romance Languages

References 

2020 deaths
1927 births
Latin Americanists
American translators
Spanish–English translators
People from Columbia, Missouri
University of Missouri alumni
University of Missouri faculty
American women writers
American women academics
21st-century American women